ICAG may refer to:

 Institute of Chartered Accountants of Ghana, a professional association
 Institute of Chartered Accountants of Guyana, a professional association
 International Consolidated Airlines Group, S.A., an airline holding company
 Iron Chef Alex Guarnaschelli, who uses "ICAG" as a nickname